is a train station in Gose, Nara, Japan.

Lines
  JR-West
  Wakayama Line

Platforms and tracks

Surroundings
 The tumulus of Emperor Kōan
 Kisshōsō-ji Temple (the Birthplace of En no Gyōja)
 Nara Prefectural Gose Industrial High School

History 
Tamade station opened on 11 March 1989.

References

External links
 Official website  

Railway stations in Japan opened in 1989
Railway stations in Nara Prefecture